Stelios Liveris is a Greek footballer currently playing for Zakynthiakos F.C. in the Football League 2 as a midfielder.

Career
Stelios Livers has played for Paniliakos and Kalamata in Beta Ethniki the 2nd higher division of Greece.
The next 5 seasons he plays for Zakynthos in 4th (2007–2008) and 3rd (2008–2012) division of Greece.

References

External links
 
 Myplayer Profile
 Onsports.gr Profile

1984 births
Living people
Greek footballers
A.P.S. Zakynthos players
Paniliakos F.C. players
Kalamata F.C. players
Association football midfielders
Sportspeople from the Ionian Islands (region)
People from Zakynthos